Dumitru Focşneanu (8 November 1935 - 20 June 2019) was a Romanian bobsledder who had his best results as a brakeman with Ion Panțuru. Together they won two medals in the two-man event at the FIBT World Championships with a silver in 1969 and a bronze in 1973.

Focşneanu competed in two-man and four-man events at the 1972 Winter Olympics and placed 10th–12th.

References

External links

 1972 bobsleigh four-man results
 Bobsleigh two-man world championship medalists since 1931

1935 births
2019 deaths
People from Breaza
Romanian male bobsledders
Olympic bobsledders of Romania
Bobsledders at the 1972 Winter Olympics